Stanisław Wilczyński (7 May 1900 – 17 August 1982) was a Polish cross-country skier. He competed in the men's 50 kilometre event at the 1928 Winter Olympics.

References

1900 births
1982 deaths
Polish male cross-country skiers
Olympic cross-country skiers of Poland
Cross-country skiers at the 1928 Winter Olympics
People from Nowy Sącz County